Anthony Dunne is a critical designer, educator and founder of the art group Dunne and Raby. He runs the studio with his long term partner and collaborator Fiona Raby.

He was a reader at the Royal College of Art Design Interactions department from 2005 - 2015 before leaving and moving to New York to take up professorships in Design and Emerging Technologies at the New School.

Publications 
 Anthony Dunne and Fiona Raby, Design Noir: The Secret Life of Electronic Objects, Basel: Birkhäuser, 2001. 
 Anthony Dunne and Fiona Raby, Hertzian Tales: Electronic Products, Aesthetic Experience, and Critical Design, The MIT Press, 1999. 
 Anthony Dunne and Fiona Raby, 'Between Reality and the Impossible' In: Biennale Internationale Design Saint-Étiennne 2010. Cité du Design Éditions, Saint-Étienne, France, pp. 129–153. 
 Anthony Dunne and Fiona Raby, Speculative Everything: Design, Fiction and Social Dreaming, The MIT Press, 2013. .
 Paola Antonelli, Emma Dexter, Fiona Raby, Iwona Blazwick, Darkitecture: Learning Architecture for the Twenty-First Century Two Little Boys, 2013.

References

Living people
People associated with the Royal College of Art
The New School faculty
Critical design practitioners
Year of birth missing (living people)